Golden Grahams is a brand of breakfast cereal owned by Cereal Partners. It is produced under the Nestlé brand worldwide, except in the US and Canada, where it is sold under the General Mills brand.

Overview
It consists of small toasted square-shaped cereal pieces made of whole wheat and corn. The taste is a mix of honey and brown sugar.

Golden Grahams was introduced in 1976, and the earliest TV commercials featured a jingle sung to the tune of the James A. Bland song "Oh, Dem Golden Slippers". The cereal is still widely available in Europe, United States and Canada. It is produced by Nestlé and Cereal Partners, except in the US and Canada, where it is made by General Mills.

United Kingdom
In October 2010, Nestlé began producing Golden Grahams in the UK again. They are available at most British grocers and hypermarkets. Nestlé formerly sold Cinnamon Grahams, which it renamed to Curiously Cinnamon around 2008. In line with Nestlé's other cereal brands, it contained reduced sugar and are made from whole grain. The cereal however was discontinued again in 2021.

See also

 List of breakfast cereals

References

External links 

Nestlé cereals
General Mills cereals
Products introduced in 1976